

History
The Singapore Women's Association (SWA), a charity organization has been organising beauty pageants since 1975 and is the first organisation to raise funds for the needy through beauty pageants. The funds raised have benefited many underprivileged children, old folks and the community. For the past 43 years, SWA has been the organiser of the Miss Singapore/Miss International beauty pageant.

Purposes
The fundamental aspect of the Miss Singapore International is its "Beauty with Heart & Purpose" to inculcate in our young women a sense of community and charity. It is a platform for young women to develop themselves as women leaders through the various training programs and involvement in its charity activities.

Our aim for this group is to create awareness, and encourage participation and contribution for charitable causes.

Titleholders

Singapore representatives at Miss International
Color key

The winner of Miss Singapore International represents her country at Miss International. On occasion, when the winner does not qualify (due to age) for either contest, a runner-up is sent. Singapore debut in 1960, before Miss Singapore International, another organization selected to the Miss International pageant. In 1960 Singapore placed for first time as Top 15 with  Christl D’Cruz.

See also
Mister Singapore
Miss Singapore Universe
Miss World Singapore
Miss Earth Singapore

References

External links

Beauty pageants in Singapore
Miss International by country
Recurring events established in 1975
Singaporean awards
Singapore